Argentina competed in the 2012 Summer Paralympics in London, United Kingdom, from 29 August to 9 September 2012. The country's flagbearer at the Games' opening ceremony was the swimmer Guillermo Marro.

Medallists

Athletics

Men–track

Men–field

Women–track

Women–field

Boccia

Argentina qualified a boccia team for the BC1/BC2 team events.

Individual

Pairs and teams

Cycling

Road

Track

Pursuit

Sprint

Time trial

Equestrian

Individual

Football 5-a-side

Argentina qualified a team for the football 5-a-side event. The Argentine team qualified as they came second place at the 2011 Parapan American Games.

Group stage

Semi-finals

Bronze medal match

Football 7-a-side

Argentina qualified a team for the football 7-a-side event. The Argentine team qualified as they came 7th in 2011 CPISRA Football 7-a-side World Championships held in Netherlands. The Iranian, Ukrainian and Brazilian teams (second, third and fourth place respectively) had already qualified for the 2012 Summer Paralympics games, allowing the Argentine team to win a spot at the Paralympics.

Group play

Semi-final for 5th–8th place

5th/6th place match

Judo

Three Argentine judokas competed at 2012 Summer Paralympics.

Powerlifting

Rowing

Qualification Legend: FA=Final A (medal); FB=Final B (non-medal); R=Repechage

Sailing

Argentina qualified a boat for the 2.4MR class competition.

Shooting

Swimming

Argentina received 8 slots to compete at the various events at the London Aquatics Centre in London. The eight Argentine swimmers competed in various events.

Men

Women

Table tennis

Men

Women

Wheelchair fencing

Note: Ranks from qualification pools were given as an overall ranking against all other competitors.

Wheelchair tennis

References

Nations at the 2012 Summer Paralympics
2012
Summer Paralympics